Events in the year 1897 in Bulgaria.

Incumbents

Events 

 Sucreries Raffineries Bulgares became active in the country.

References 

 
1890s in Bulgaria
Years of the 20th century in Bulgaria
Bulgaria
Bulgaria